The pūtātara is a type of trumpet used by the Māori people of New Zealand. It is customarily made with a carved wooden mouthpiece and a bell made from New Zealand's small native conch shells (Charonia lampas rubicunda) or triton shell (Charonia tritonis). Larger pūtātara were particularly prized as the triton shell was rarely found and only sometimes washed up on the beaches in the Far North.

References

External links
Pūtātara in the collection of the Museum of New Zealand Te Papa Tongarewa

Māori musical instruments
Brass instruments
Trumpets